Kungsgårdssjön is a lake located in the province of Dalarna, Sweden. The lake has an area of 1.25 km2.

References

Dalarna
Lakes of Dalarna County